Mascalucia (Sicilian: Mascalucìa) is a comune (municipality) in the Metropolitan City of Catania in the Italian region Sicily, located about  southeast of Palermo and about  north of Catania.  

Mascalucia borders the following municipalities: Belpasso, Catania, Gravina di Catania, Nicolosi, Pedara, San Pietro Clarenza, Tremestieri Etneo.
It is also the most populated Comune of Catania's province.

References

External links
 Official website

Cities and towns in Sicily